{{Infobox Military Conflict
|conflict=Action of 20 October 1778
|partof=the Anglo-French War
|image=Combat du 20 octobre 1778.jpg
|image_size = 300px
|caption=Action of the French ship 'Triton against the Jupiter and the Medea
|date=20 October 1778
|place=off Cape Fisterra, Galicia
|coordinates =
|result=Indecisive
|combatant1=
|combatant2=
|commander1= Gaspard de Ligondès
|commander2= Francis Reynolds James Montagu
|strength1=ship-of-the-line Triton|strength2=ship-of-the-line JupiterFrigate Medea|casualties1=13 killed20 wounded
|casualties2=4 killed10 wounded
|campaignbox=
}}

The action of 20 October 1778 was an inconclusive engagement between the French ship-of-the-line Triton and British ship-of-the-line Jupiter with a frigate Medea that took place off Cape Finisterre in the Bay of Biscay. Darkness separated the combatants before any decisive result was obtained.

Background

The outbreak of the War of the American Independence had caused relations between France and Great Britain to deteriorate. After signing a formal treaty with the United States in February 1778, France broke diplomatic ties and declared war on Britain on 16 March 1778.

Action

On 20 October, the French ship-of-the-line Triton under Captain Gaspard de Ligondès, cruising on the Bay of Biscay, fell in with the British ship of the line Jupiter, under Captain Francis Reynolds, and the frigate Medea, under Captain James Montagu. At about 5 PM both sides were at close quarters; Jupiter ranged up on one side of Triton, Medea on the other, about nightfall, and they fired on Triton. Ligondès succeeded in turning the same broadside to both his assailants, putting Medea out of action with a shot below the water line after the first half-hour of fight, but he was wounded in both arms soon afterward and had to hand over the command to Lieutenant de Roquart. Medea retreated from the action; Triton and Jupiter continued to exchange fire for more two hours, until a squall of wind and rain, and the impenetrable darkness of the night separated the combatants.Triton had thirteen killed and about twenty wounded, she had fifty shot in her hull or masts, and her sails and rigging were much cut up, but Captain Reynolds reported that she was still able to sail. Jupiter had to sail back into Lisbon for refit with three killed and seven wounded. Medea'' suffered one killed and three wounded.

Aftermath 
Ligondès died of his wound in Brest on 26 January 1779.

References
Citations

Bibliography
 
  
 
 

Naval battles involving France
Naval battles involving Great Britain
Naval battles of the Anglo-French War (1778–1783)
Action of 20 October 1778